Tadellöser & Wolff is a 1975 two-part television film which was produced for the German public-service TV-broadcaster ZDF in Sepia. It is based on the 1971 book of the same name by Walter Kempowski. The first broadcast took place on May 1 and 3, 1975. The film was a great success in Germany,

Plot 
The film begins like a documentary: Ernst Jacobi in the role of Walter Kempowski introduces the viewer to the action with family photos and pictures from Rostock. As a result, Jacobi occasionally comments on the film plot from offscreen.

The film portrays the life of the middle-class family Kempowski in Rostock from 1939 to 1945 in close detail to the novel. In addition to describing the special events in the life of Walter and in the family, there are always depictions of everyday life, such as walks with the father through Rostock, in school and youth group, with friends and swing music, with eating together and Christmas celebrations with the family, going to church or going to the cinema. Father Karl loves cigars from the company "Loeser & Wolff", which, when praised, always prompts him to say „tadellos, tadellöser, Tadellöser und Wolff“ (translated: "impeccable, impeccable, impeccable and Wolff").

The story begins when the Kempowski family moves into a new apartment in Rostock on April 16, 1939. This is followed by a description of the situation in the new apartment and the events in the family, during a meal together, during a visit to the grandfather and at a scene with the neighbor's daughter.

During a dinner, Father Karl announces a vacation trip. The family travels to the Harz on August 10, 1939, where they house in an officers' home. There they get the news of an impending war, whereupon they leave prematurely.

Soon after the family's return, the paternal grandfather died. Considering the estate, considerable debts are found, which now have to be repaid, so the family cannot move into the grandfather's villa, but rents it out. Walter gets sick on Christmas Day. The doctor diagnoses scarlet fever and speaks over a recovery period of six weeks.

Later Walter took piano lessons. The piano teacher is strict and Walter doesn't seem to have practiced enough. Nevertheless, in 1941 he played the piano at a Hitler Youth Christmas party in the Rostock City Theater.

Then there is a heavy bomb attack on Rostock. Mother Grete is assigned as an air-raid warning officer and sends the house residents down to the basement. With the end of the bombings the apartment building is only slightly damaged, but some bombs have hit in the street. Brother Robert, who was on the road as a responder in the city, tells his family about the reports on the considerable destruction in Rostock he had to make, that the Selters-water-factory in the neighborhood burns down.

The Dane Sven Sörensen, an employee in the father's office, was arrested by the Gestapo for tracing successful bombings on a city map. Mother Grete goes to the Gestapo to get him released. He was released shortly afterwards and moved into the Kempowski family's apartment because his own apartment was destroyed by the bombing.

When Father Karl, who is a first lieutenant in the Wehrmacht comes home during vacation from the front, there are tensions in the family at first, which eventually calm down. Since Walter's achievements in school have deteriorated considerably, it is decided that he has to go to the very strict Anna Kröger, called Aunt Anna, to tutor.

Walter's sister Ulla and Sven Sörensen get married in May 1943. The racial laws do not pose any difficulties for the young couple, as Sven is "Northerner". The wedding celebration, where many relatives attend to, takes place in the Kempowski family's apartment and because of the food that had to be brought from the black market because of the war economy

Ulla and Sven then move to Denmark. The family says goodbye to them at the train station on the train to Copenhagen. The family members remaining in Rostock are sad on the one hand about the farewell, but on the other hand also happy because Ulla is now in a safe place.

During the school holidays in 1944, Walter spent three weeks at the estate Gut Germitz. This estate on Plauer See belongs to the family of Ferdinand von Germitz, whom he knew from tutoring at Anna Kröger. During his stay, he got to know Greta, Ferdinand's sister, better.

Father Karl came home on vacation again in October 1944. Due to the current war situation, the mood during his stay is already very sad. At the end of his vacation, Walter and his mother say goodbye to the father at the train station. From there, he returns to his post in an uncertain future.

Since Mother Grete's father's house in Hamburg was destroyed by the bombing, he comes to Rostock. The grandfather is admitted to the family home. A refugee, Frau Stoffel, has also been billeted.

On February 17, 1945, Walter was also drafted into the military. He works as a courier, and in mid-April 1945 on an assignment in Berlin, he realizes that the Russians (Red Army Soldiers) must have come very close to the city. He looks for a way out of the city and then manages to find a train to Rostock in Nauen (Brandenburg), with which he arrives in Rostock on April 25, 1945. The film ends with the scene on the May 1, 1945 (the day of the end of world war 2), where Walter sits on the balcony with his mother and grandfather to see Russian soldiers for the first time, as they march into their street in Rostock.

Cast
 Edda Seippel as Margarethe Kempowski
 Karl Lieffen as Karl Kempowski
 Michael Poliza as Walter Kempowski (als Jugendlicher)
 Martin Kollewe as Walter Kempowski (als Junge)
 Martin Semmelrogge as Robert Kempowski
 Gabriele Michel as Ulla Kempowski
 Jesper Christensen as Sven Sörensen
 Ernst Jacobi as Erzähler
 Ernst von Klipstein as Großvater de Bonsac
 Helga Feddersen as Anna Kröger
 Gert Haucke as Dr. Fink
 Marianne Kehlau
 Inge Landgut

Filming 
The entire film was not shot in color, but Fechner deliberately chose sepia as a stylistic device to give the film more authenticity. The shooting took place in October 1974 partly in Börßum (Lower Saxony), Lüneburg, Eckernförde and Hamburg-Harburg.

Movie Score 
The basic musical theme of the film with the text “Years of Life; all in vain. When will we see each other again? ”, was delivered within the first movement of the 6th Symphony in B minor, op. 74, by Peter Tchaikovsky. In the course of the film, the jazz classic Georgia on My Mind by Hoagy Carmichael is played in several scenes.

Critics 

 „The cast also appears to be optimal: How Edda Seippel plays mother Kempowski's oppressively unsuspecting indestructibility, how she nags her notorious “No, how it is now possible”: how Martin Semmelrogge puts down the sekundaner's elan of the son Robert; how Karl Lieffen, here a disciplined comedian, lets the "birdy" father cracking his jokes and in the end even imbues him with a trace of tragedy due to his booze, which becomes less tired under the war experience - "prime"! “
 „ A film is shown - the director: better not imaginable; the actors: accomplishing the feat of showing individuals who are exemplary - people who, unmistakable in their independence, nevertheless function as character masks - a film that, in the past, also means the present. The perfect, show Kempowski and Fechner, is an imperfect. The action is still ongoing. The K. family has not changed in its structure. The film's leitmotifs point beyond the piece and show that it can be repeated at any time. The social-Darwinian pattern of thought of this family remains dominant.“

Sequel 
In 1979, also under Fechner's direction, the three-part continuation of the Kempowskian family history appeared under the title "Ein Kapitel für sich" (A chapter for itself).

References 

1975 films
1975 television films
German television films
West German films
World War II television drama series
Films set on the home front during World War II
Films based on German novels
Films about Nazi Germany
German-language television shows
Television shows based on German novels
1975 German television series debuts
1975 German television series endings
Grimme-Preis for fiction winners
ZDF original programming